TA muscle can refer to:
 Tibialis anterior muscle
 Transversus abdominis muscle